99% may refer to:

Music
 99 Percent, an American hip hop duo
 99% (Meat Beat Manifesto album), 1990
 99% (Ska-P album), 2013
 "99 Percenters", a 2011 song by Ministry
 "99%", a song by Soul Asylum from the 1992 album Grave Dancers Union

Other uses
 99 Percent – Civic Voice, a political party in Slovakia
 99%: The Occupy Wall Street Collaborative Film, a 2013 documentary film
 We are the 99%, a political slogan

See also
 
 
 One percent (disambiguation)
 Two percent (disambiguation)
 99 cents (disambiguation)
 99p (disambiguation)
 99 Percent Declaration, an American not-for-profit organization
 "We are the 99%", a political slogan used by the Occupy movement 
 99.9%, a 2016 album by Kaytranada
 0.999...
 Percentage